The 2S31 Vena is a Russian amphibious self-propelled 120 mm mortar system. "2S31" is its GRAU designation.

Description
The 2S31 consists of a 120mm 2A80 rifled gun-mortar  mounted on the chassis of the BMP-3 infantry combat vehicle. It was developed by Joint Stock Venture "Plants of Motovilikha". The 2S31's turret is equipped with digital automated fire control system, navigation system, and optical/electronic reconnaissance and target acquisition system. Its 2A80 gun-mortar is capable of launching a high-explosive mortar projectile with a maximum range of 18,000 metres. The vehicle is protected by a welded aluminium hull to protect against small arms fire and shrapnel. It can also fire armour-piercing projectiles that can penetrate up to 650mm of steel plate at ranges of up to a kilometre. A separate sighting system is used when engaging in direct fire mode.

Current operators

See also
2S9 Nona

References

External links 

2S31 Vena Technical Data Sheet - specifications - pictures - video
Description at the website of its manufacturer
2S31 Offered to Venezuela

Self-propelled artillery of Russia
120 mm artillery
120mm mortars
Gun-mortars
Motovilikha Plants products
Military vehicles introduced in the 1990s